National U was a student-run tabloid newspaper in Australia. It was preceded by the short lived 'U' and followed by the short lived 'Axis'.
It was  published by the National Union of Australian University Students the precursor of the  Australian Union of Students in the 1960s and 1970s.  Due to the political issues of the era the newspaper was a vital part of Australian national student politics of the time.

Publication details including 
 U (Melbourne, Vic.) National Union of Australian University Students journal. Melbourne : The Union, 1965-[1966]. Vol. 1, no. 1 (29 September 1965)-
 National U. Melbourne: [National Union of Australian University Students], [1966]-1975. ISSN 0313-8224
 Axis : national student newspaper. Carlton, Vic. : Australian Union of Students, 1976-1976. ISSN 0313-8232.  No. 1 (8 March 1976)-no. 12 (18 October 1976)
 National student. Carlton, Vic. : Australian Union of Students. ISSN 0156-5346. 1977.

Student newspapers published in Australia
Students' unions in Australia
Student politics in Australia
Defunct newspapers published in Melbourne